Planes of Fame Air Museum is an aviation museum in Chino, California, and Valle, Arizona.  The museum has many flying and static aircraft, along with several rare examples under restoration.

History
Planes of Fame Air Museum was founded by Edward T. Maloney on January 12, 1957, in Claremont, California, to save historically important aircraft. At that time, it was called The Air Museum. A small group of volunteers, including future museum president Steve Hinton, set out to make the museum's aircraft flyable.

In 1962, after the museum's collection of aircraft and memorabilia outgrew its original home, it moved to nearby Ontario Airport, California.

In 1970, redevelopment of the airport at Ontario forced the museum to move again. The nonflyable aircraft became part of the "Movie World: Cars of the Stars and Planes of Fame Museum" in Buena Park, California, near Knott's Berry Farm, while the flyable aircraft moved to Chino Airport, about 30 mi (48 km) away. This airport was formerly the home of Cal-Aero Academy, an Army Air Corps facility that trained more than 10,000 pilots before the end of World War II.

When Movie World closed in 1973, the name "Planes of Fame" was transferred, along with the static planes, to the flying collection at Chino.

As more aircraft were restored and the collection grew, an additional display facility was opened in 1995 at Valle, Arizona. Located halfway between Williams, Arizona, and the south rim of the Grand Canyon, it houses more than 40 of the museum's aircraft, many flyable.

The Chino facility opened its Enterprise Hangar in 2002. Designed to resemble the hangar deck of a World War II aircraft carrier, it contains a number of items from the USS Enterprise (CV-6) donated by members of her crew and flight squadrons. It also houses many aircraft typical of those that served on the Enterprise during the war.

The Chino facility was further expanded in 2004–08, adding two new hangars, new offices, a gift shop, library, and the Hands-On Aviation youth education center. Display areas for jets and other aircraft of the Korean War, Cold War, and Vietnam War were added. In October 2009, another new hangar was dedicated, this one built by the 475th Fighter Group to store their memorabilia and house the museum's rare Lockheed P-38 Lightning.

The museum was the subject of a lawsuit brought by Yanks Air Museum and other tenants at Chino Airport in 2016 who argued that the museum's airshow interfered with other flight operations.

The museum announced plans to open a new location at the Santa Maria Public Airport.

Collection

The museum's collection of Japanese aircraft is the largest of its type in the world. This collection includes the only authentic airworthy example of the Japanese Mitsubishi A6M Zero fighter in the world, with its original Sakae engine and an Aichi D3A featured in the movie Tora! Tora! Tora!.

Many other rare aircraft are maintained in flyable condition, such as a North American P-51A Mustang, a Boeing P-26A Peashooter, a Lockheed P-38J Lightning, and a Republic P-47G Thunderbolt.

Many of the museum's roughly 150 aircraft were built in Southern California, and about 30 are flyable. Others are under restoration in the full-time restoration facility.

 the complete collection consists of:

Monthly flights and annual airshows 

The museum holds a monthly mini-airshow around a certain theme, such as: "World War I Aviation", "Experimental Aircraft", "Korean War Aviation", "Airplanes In The Movies" and "Naval Aviation". Each mini-airshow starts with one or more talks or seminars given by people involved with the featured aircraft (such as combat pilots), followed by a flight demonstration of two or three aircraft related to that day's theme.

The museum flies all of its airworthy aircraft, as well as many other warbirds visiting from other museums or brought by private owners, during its annual airshow. This event is the largest gathering of warbirds in the western US. Many aircraft are rare or one of a kind.

Military vehicles
The Military Vehicle Corps, often referred to as the Motor Pool, is a small group within the Planes of Fame Air Museum. The Military Vehicles in their collection are primarily from World War II and are maintained and operated by a group of Museum volunteers. These vehicles are used in parades, public events (e.g. Marching Thru History), and WWII re-enactments. The following vehicles are some of those that are on display at Chino.
 M4A1 Sherman Tank
 1941 WC-54 Dodge Ambulance
 GMC CCKW

475th Fighter Group

In the late 1990s, members of the 475th Fighter Group (Satan's Angels) established a permanent home for the artifacts, photographs, records and memories of their U.S. Army Air Forces unit, which recorded 562 victories, received two Presidential Unit Citations, and produced 42 "Aces" in the South Pacific combat area. It was the first all-Lockheed P-38 group and the only one formed overseas in Australia. Many people have donated time, skills and memorabilia to preserve the history and proud heritage of the many valiant men of the 475th.

This new museum was dedicated in October 1997, at the expanding March Field Air Museum complex at the former March Air Force Base near Riverside, California, where the first test flight of the P-38 took place. The March Field Museum chronicles the history of U.S. military aviation since 1917. Legally known as The 475th Fighter Group Historical Foundation, Inc., the museum was housed in a  modern steel building reminiscent of a World War II military hangar.

In 2005, the museum's board decided to merge the museum into The Air Museum Planes of Fame. As of 2015, a  hangar at Planes of Fame was under construction for the 475th.

See also
 Yanks Air Museum, another air museum located at the Chino Airport.
 List of aerospace museums

References

Notes

Bibliography

 Mormillo, Frank B. "Chino's 'Planes of Fame'". Air Enthusiast. Twenty-three, December 1983–March 1984. Bromley, UK: Fine Scroll. . pp. 56–64.

External links 

 Planes of Fame Official Site
 Racing Planes of Fame: A visit to the Planes of Fame Air Museum
 Pacific Wrecks Database listing
 YouTube video of Planes of Fame Air Museum

Aerospace museums in California
Aerospace museums in Arizona
Museums in San Bernardino County, California
Museums in Coconino County, Arizona
Museums established in 1957
Chino, California
Aerospace museums